Thomas Tuckey Hallaran (1830–1915) was Archdeacon of Ardfert from 1915 to 1922.

The son of a Church of Ireland priest, Hallaran was educated at Trinity College, Dublin. He was the Incumbent at Cahir from 1867 until his death.

His son was an Irish rugby international.

References

Alumni of Trinity College Dublin
Archdeacons of Ardfert
1830 births
1915 deaths
People from County Cork